This is a list of Spanish sail frigates built or acquired during the period 1700-1854

Spanish frigates generally had religious names, often the names of saints or "our Lady". Those with primarily secular names (such as royal, geographical or adjectival names) usually had additionally a religious name (Avocación or alias), which is listed below in the second column where known. 

An asterisk (*) in the "Launch date" column indicates the date of acquisition (purchase or capture) for vessels not built for the Spanish Navy.

The Habsburg Era - pre 1700
During the 17th century, and for much of the first half of the 18th century, the term 'frigate' (or 'fragata' in Spanish) encompassed ships with two complete gundecks rated at about 50 guns as well as smaller single-decked vessels. The smaller frigates evolved from the fast and lightly-armed vessels built chiefly on the coast of (Spanish) Flanders, and employed in the English Channel and southern North Sea, as well as escorting the trade routes from the Spanish Netherlands to the north coast of Spain.

The Early Bourbon Era - 1700 to 1750

The Middle Bourbon Era - 1750 to 1808

The Final phase - 1815 to 1854
The post-Napoleonic era began with the acquisition of six frigates from Russia in 1818. These proved of poor quality and were soon disposed of.

See also
List of ships of the line of Spain
List of galleons of Spain

Frigates
Spanish frigates
Frigates
Lists of frigates